The following tables show state-by-state results in the Australian Senate at the 1987 federal election. This election was a Double dissolution, which means that all 12 senators from each state were up for election. Senators total 29 coalition (27 Liberal, one coalition National, one CLP), 32 Labor, one Jo Vallentine Peace Group, four non-coalition National, seven Democrats, one Nuclear Disarmament and one Independent. Territory Senators served until the next federal election. State Senator terms were nominally three or six years, backdated from 1 July 1987. The Senate used the order-elected method to allocate three- and six-year seats, despite provisions for the AEC to conduct a special recount.

Australia 

 As this was a double-dissolution election, all Senate seats were contested.

New South Wales

Victoria

Queensland

Western Australia

South Australia

Tasmania

Australian Capital Territory

Northern Territory

See also

1987 Australian federal election
Candidates of the 1987 Australian federal election
Members of the Australian Senate, 1987–1990

Notes

References

1987 elections in Australia
Senate 1987
Australian Senate elections